Unni Steinsmo (born 15 March 1954) is a Norwegian chemical engineer and researcher. She served as chief executive of SINTEF from 2004 to 2016.

Steinsmo was born in Levanger. She graduated as chemical engineer from the Norwegian Institute of Technology, and as dr.ing. in materials science in 1987. She was appointed research director at SINTEF from 1997 to 2003, and Chief executive officer from 2004. She has been a board member of Research Council of Norway and member of the European Research Advisory Board.

References

1954 births
Living people
People from Levanger
Norwegian Institute of Technology alumni
Norwegian chemical engineers